Italino was an Italian comic strip series created by  Antonio Rubino.

Italino was published by the children magazine Il Corriere dei Piccoli from 1915,  on the eve of the entry of Italy in World War, to 1919. It depicts the patriotic and humorous stories of Italino, an interventionist young Trentino farmer who enjoys doing spites to his Austro-Hungarian rival Kartoffel Otto.

References 

Italian comic strips
Italian comics characters
1915 comics debuts
1919 comics endings
Humor comics
Text comics
Fictional farmers
Fictional Italian people